Juan Manuel Azconzábal (born 8 September 1974 in Junín, Buenos Aires) is an Argentine football coach and former defender who played professional football for ten clubs in six countries.

Career
Azconzábal made his debut with Estudiantes de La Plata in 1994, and played for the club until 2002. That year, Azconzábal moved to Mexico to play for Tecos. he returned to Argentina in 2003 to play for Chacarita Juniors. Azconzábal then played for Universitario in Peru and Emelec in Ecuador before returning to Argentina to play for> Banfield. In 2006, he moved to Colombia to play for Independiente Medellín but returned once again to Argentina later that year to sign for Rosario Central. After a short stint in the Canary Islands with Las Palmas, he signed for Club Atlético Tucumán.

After his retirement, Azconzábal was signed by Estudiantes as manager of football operations. Upon the resignation of Miguel Angel Russo on 7 November 2011, Azconzábal was named caretaker coach, and after a string of good results he was appointed as coach for the 2012 Clausura tournament.

Azconzábal's nickname is "el vasco" (the Basque), as his surname is of Basque origin.

External links
Juan Manuel Azconzábal at Football-Lineups
Juan Manuel Azconzábal – Primera División statistics at Fútbol XXI 

Juan Manuel Azconzábal at Footballdatabase

1974 births
Living people
People from Junín, Buenos Aires
Argentine people of Basque descent
Argentine footballers
Argentine expatriate footballers
Association football defenders
Argentine Primera División players
Categoría Primera A players
Ecuadorian Serie A players
Liga MX players
Peruvian Primera División players
Segunda División players
Expatriate footballers in Colombia
Expatriate footballers in Ecuador
Expatriate footballers in Mexico
Expatriate footballers in Peru
Expatriate footballers in Spain
Expatriate football managers in Chile
Expatriate football managers in Paraguay
Estudiantes de La Plata footballers
Chacarita Juniors footballers
Club Universitario de Deportes footballers
C.S. Emelec footballers
Club Atlético Banfield footballers
Independiente Medellín footballers
Rosario Central footballers
UD Las Palmas players
Atlético Tucumán footballers
Tecos F.C. footballers
Argentine expatriate sportspeople in Mexico
Argentine expatriate sportspeople in Spain
Argentine football managers
Estudiantes de La Plata managers
Argentina youth international footballers
Club Atlético Huracán managers
Atlético Tucumán managers
Sportspeople from Buenos Aires Province